Nahar (also Romanized as Nāhar) is a village in Kharturan Rural District, Beyarjomand District, Shahrud County, Semnan Province, Iran. At the 2006 census, its population was 53, in 16 families.

References 

Populated places in Shahrud County